Gomphrena sonorae, the Sonoran globe amaranth, is an herbaceous perennial plant in the amaranth family (Amaranthaceae) found in the Sonoran Desert. When dried, the translucent flowers are used to add accent to dry flower arrangements.

References

sonorae
Flora of the Sonoran Deserts